Bishop Lloyd may refer to:

William Lloyd (Bishop of Worcester) (1627–1717), bishop of St Asaph, Lichfield and Coventry, then Worcester in England; he supervised the addition of Ussher's (revised) chronology to the 1701 edition of the Bible.
William Lloyd (Bishop of Norwich) (1637–1710), bishop of Llandaff in Wales, then Peterborough and Norwich in England
Charles Lloyd (bishop) (1784–1829), Regius Professor of Divinity and Bishop of Oxford from 1827 to 1829
Arthur Lloyd (bishop) (1844–1907) Anglican Bishop in England
Humphrey Lloyd (bishop) (1610–1689), Bishop of Bangor in England
Hugh Lloyd (bishop) (circa 1586–1667), Welsh cleric who was the Anglican bishop of Llandaff
John Lloyd (Bishop of St David's) (1638–1687), Vice-Chancellor of Oxford University and Bishop of St David's
John Lloyd (Bishop of Swansea) (1847–1915), Welsh suffragan bishop

See also
Lloyd Clifton Bishop (1890–1968), Major League Baseball pitcher
Bishop Lloyd's House in Chester, England